The 1935 New South Wales Rugby Football League premiership was the twenty-eighth season of Sydney’s top-grade rugby league club competition, Australia’s first. The season culminated in Eastern Suburbs’ victory over South Sydney in the final.

Teams
The addition of Canterbury-Bankstown meant that the League involved nine clubs for the first time since 1929.
 Balmain, formed on January 23, 1908, at Balmain Town Hall
 Canterbury-Bankstown, formed October 30, 1934.
 Eastern Suburbs, formed on January 24, 1908, at Paddington Town Hall
 Newtown, formed on January 14, 1908
 North Sydney, formed on February 7, 1908
 South Sydney, formed on January 17, 1908, at Redfern Town Hall
 St. George, formed on November 8, 1920, at Kogarah School of Arts
 University, formed in 1919 at Sydney University
 Western Suburbs, formed on February 4, 1908

Records set in 1935

The University club did not win a single match in 1935, continuing a losing streak that started in round 2, 1934 and which would run till round 14, 1936, and which marks the most consecutive losses in NSWRL/NRL premiership history at 42.

On 11 May at Earl Park, St. George defeated newcomers Canterbury 91–6, this remaining the biggest winning margin and most points scored by one team in the history of the NSWRFL/NSWRL/ARL/NRL, beating South Sydney’s 67–nil win over Western Suburbs in 1910. The following weekend on 18 May, Eastern Suburbs defeated the “Cantabs” (as Canterbury were initially known) 87–7, this remaining the second-highest score and winning margin in the history of the competition. The record in any grade occurred on 19 July 1913 when South Sydney reserves defeated Mosman by 102 points to 2.

In the second half of the Earl Park match, St. George scored fourteen tries and sixty-eight points, this being the most scored in one half of any match.

Eastern Suburbs winger Rod O'Loan scored a club record of seven tries in a 61–5 win over University. This tally stands second (behind Frank Burge's eight tries in 1920) on the list of most individual tries in a premiership match. Dave Brown’s six tries in a 1935 game against Canterbury stands in equal third place in that same list, Easts winning the match 65–10.

The standing record for most tries in one season also comes from 1935, being 38 by Brown.

Dave Brown’s season tally of 244 points stood for 34 years as the record points scored in a season until topped by Eric Simms in 1969.

Ladder

Finals
In the two semi-finals played as a double-header at the Sydney Cricket Ground on the same day, the top two ranked teams Eastern Suburbs and South Sydney beat their lower-ranked opponents Western Suburbs and North Sydney. Eastern Suburbs and South Sydney won their respective matches and met each other in the Final.

Premiership Final

Before a crowd of 22,106 and refereed by Tom McMahon, Easts led 9–nil at half-time and were never headed despite being without their record-breaking centre, Dave Brown.

Scorers
 Eastern Suburbs
Tries: Rod O'Loan 2, Harry Pierce, Fred Tottey, Jack Beaton. Goals: Ross McKinnon 2

South Sydney
Try: George Shankland

Source:

Player statistics
The following statistics are as of the conclusion of Round 18.

Top 5 point scorers

Top 5 try scorers

Top 5 goal scorers

References

External links
 Rugby League Tables - Notes AFL Tables
 Rugby League Tables - Season 1935 AFL Tables

New South Wales Rugby League premiership
NSWRFL season